The Zrinski Topolovac shooting was a mass shooting that occurred in Zrinski Topolovac, Bjelovar-Bilogora County, Croatia on 1 January 1993, when 28-year-old soldier Vinko Palić killed nine people and wounded seven others at a New Year's Eve party, before committing suicide.

Shooting
In the early hours of January 1, 1993 in the Zrinski Topolovac clergy house, the party (attended by about 40 people) took place. During it, Palić and another man quarreled over a woman. After that, Palić went home, changed into a military uniform, took an automatic rifle and returned to the party. There, he shot dead 8 guests, including his rival, the woman whom he sought affection from and his brother, and injured 6 others. He also killed one police officer and wounded another when they arrived on call. The shooting lasted two hours. During it, he spared the priest, saying "You, I won't, you're a priest". After the shooting, he committed suicide.

Perpetrator
Vinko Palić (28) was a soldier of the 105th Brigade of the Croatian Army. He had returned from the Croatian War of Independence two weeks before the shooting. Another weapon was found in his house.

References

1993 crimes in Croatia
1993 murders in Europe
Deaths by firearm in Croatia
January 1993 crimes
January 1993 events in Europe
Mass murder in 1993
Massacres in Croatia
Murder–suicides in Croatia
Suicides by firearm in Croatia
1993 mass shootings in Europe
Mass shootings in Croatia
1993 in Croatia
Attacks during the New Year celebrations